Scott Street Methodist Church is located in Perth, Perth and Kinross, Scotland. Standing in the city centre, it was completed in 1880, and is now a Category C listed building. The church was designed by architect Alexander Petrie.

A "good, well-detailed example of a late 19th century ecclesiastical building," it is notable for its prominent broached spire, which climbs out of its street-facing elevation.

See also

List of listed buildings in Perth, Scotland

References 

Category C listed buildings in Perth and Kinross
Listed churches in Scotland
Scott Street Methodist Church
1880 establishments in Scotland
Listed buildings in Perth, Scotland